Latypovka (Latip) is a rural locality (a village) in Maximovksky Selsoviet, Sterlitamaksky District, Bashkortostan, Russia. The population was 57 as of 2010. There is 1 street.

Geography 
Latypovka is located 59 km west of Sterlitamak (the district's administrative centre) by road. Alga is the nearest rural locality.

References 

Rural localities in Sterlitamaksky District